The Alliance of Vojvodina Hungarians (abbr. СВМ, SVM, or VMSZ) is a regionalist political party in Serbia representing the Hungarian minority.

History

Foundation and early history 
The party was founded in 1994 in Senta by József Kasza and former members of the Democratic Fellowship of Vojvodina Hungarians as a citizen group which in 1995 was registered as a political party. They participated in the 1997 parliamentary election in which they won 1.23% of the vote and 4 seats in the National Assembly. In early 2000, it was one of the founding members of the Democratic Opposition of Serbia (DOS) which ousted the president Slobodan Milošević later that year. In the 2000 parliamentary election they participated under the DOS coalition and the party won 6 seats in the parliament.

Post-Milošević era and leadership change 
From the early 2000s, they started promoting an idea to form a Hungarian Regional Autonomy in the northern part of Vojvodina. In the 2003 parliamentary election they ended up not passing the electoral threshold with 4.23% of the vote. In 2007 they participated alone and they won 1.3% of the vote and 3 seats in the parliament. They also participated in the 2004 provincial election in Vojvodina and the party won 8.50% of vote in the one-round voting system and was part of the ruling coalition in the Vojvodina provincial parliament. In the 2004 local elections, the party won the largest number of seats in the municipal parliaments of Subotica, Senta, Bačka Topola, Mali Iđoš, Kanjiža (where Reformists of Vojvodina won same number of seats) and Čoka. In 2008, the party elected István Pásztor as their new president while József Kasza remained as the honorary president until 2010, when his membership was revoked. In 2008, they participated in the provincial election in Vojvodina, local elections and parliamentary election and they were a part of the Hungarian Coalition which won 7% of the vote in the provincial election and 1.81% and 4 seats in the parliamentary election, while in Kanjiža they won 50.91%, in Senta 31.87%, Bačka Topola 46.25%, Mali Iđoš 37.18%, and Bečej 29.63%. Since the introduction of the multi-party system in Serbia, the mayor of Subotica was often from the Alliance of Vojvodina Hungarians. That has changed after local elections 2008, when Democratic Party won the largest number of votes in this city.

Modern period 
In 2012, they participated in the parliamentary election, local elections, provincial election and presidential election. In the parliamentary election, they won 1.75% of the vote and 5 seats in the National Assembly, in Novi Sad they won one seat while in Subotica they won 22.52% of the vote, in the provincial election they won 5.83% of the vote and 7 seats, and in the presidential election, in the first round, Pásztor won 1.62% of the vote in the first round while in the second round he supported Boris Tadić. Since the 2014 parliamentary election, they have been supporting the ruling SNS-led coalition. In 2014 they won 2.1% of the vote and 6 seats in the parliament, in 2016 they won 1.5% of the vote and lost two seats and then in 2020 they won 2.23% of the vote and got 5 more seats in the parliament.

Political positions 
Besides being supportive of Hungarian minority interests, the Alliance of Vojvodina Hungarians also maintains a conservative ideology, and is also supportive of regionalism. Its foreign policies are considered to be pro-Western, and it supports Serbia's accession to the European Union and NATO. It was considered a social-democratic party until 2010, when it shifted their support towards the Serbian Progressive Party and Fidesz.

It is positioned on the centre-right on the political spectrum. It is also an associate member of the European People's Party.

Electoral performance

Parliamentary elections

Presidential elections

Provincial elections

Positions held
Major positions held by Alliance of Vojvodina Hungarians members:

See also
Hungarian Coalition
Hungarian Regional Autonomy

References

External links
Official website

1994 establishments in Serbia
Conservative parties in Serbia
Hungarian political parties in Serbia
Political parties established in 1994
Politics of Vojvodina
Pro-European political parties in Serbia
Regionalist parties
Centre-right parties in Europe
Social democratic parties in Serbia